Charlton Abbots is a village and former civil parish  east of Gloucester, now in the parish of Sudeley, in the Tewkesbury district, in the county of Gloucestershire, England. In 1931 the parish had a population of 71.

History 
The name "Charlton" means 'Free peasants farm/settlement', the "Abbots" part being from the fact that it was held by Winchcombe Abbey. Charlton Abbots was recorded in the Domesday Book as Cerletone. On 25 March 1883 part of Winchcombe parish was transferred to Charlton Abbots. On 1 April 1935 the parish was abolished and merged with Sudeley Manor and part of Sevenhampton to form Sudeley.

References

External links 

 

Villages in Gloucestershire
Former civil parishes in Gloucestershire
Borough of Tewkesbury